Deoxyribonuclease (pyrimidine dimer) (endodeoxyribonuclease (pyrimidine dimer), bacteriophage T4 endodeoxyribonuclease V, T4 endonuclease V) is an enzyme. This enzyme catalyses the following chemical reaction:

 Endonucleolytic cleavage near pyrimidine dimers to products with 5'-phosphate

This enzyme acts on a damaged strand, 5' from the damaged site.

References

External links 

EC 3.1.25